Joost Posthuma (born 8 March 1981) is a Dutch retired professional road bicycle racer, who competed as a professional between 2004 and 2012. Born in Hengelo, Posthuma was known for his time-trialling and he wore the white jersey for the best young rider at the 2006 Tour de France. Posthuma set the best time for riders eligible for the young rider classification in the prologue, but lost it after the 1st road stage, after a rival got in a breakaway and got bonus seconds on the road.

Major results
Source:

2003
 1st Overall Olympia's Tour
 1st Overall Thüringen Rundfahrt der U23
 1st Prologue Tour de Normandie
2004
 1st Overall Circuit des Mines
1st Stage 8
2005
 1st Grote Prijs Jef Scherens
 1st Stage 4 Paris–Nice
2006
 1st Ridderronde Maastricht
 6th Overall Eneco Tour
 Tour de France
Held  after Prologue
2007
 1st  Overall Sachsen Tour
1st Stage 4 (ITT)
 2nd Overall Three Days of De Panne
2008
 1st  Overall Three Days of De Panne
1st Stage 3b (ITT)
 1st  Overall Tour of Luxembourg
2009
 1st  Overall Vuelta a Andalucía
2010
 1st Stage 7 (ITT) Tour of Austria
2011
 9th Overall Tour of Britain
2012
 8th Overall Bayern–Rundfahrt

Grand Tour general classification results timeline

References

External links 
 Official Website (in Dutch)
 Profile on Rabobank official website
 

Dutch male cyclists
1981 births
Living people
Sportspeople from Hengelo
UCI Road World Championships cyclists for the Netherlands
Cyclists from Overijssel